Andrew Smith (born 21 July 2000) is an Irish rugby union player. He plays for Pro14 and European Rugby Champions Cup side Leinster as a wing. He also plays for the Ireland national rugby sevens team as a forward.

In school, Smith played rugby with St. Michael’s College.

Leinster
Smith was named in the Leinster academy for the 2020–21 season. He made his Leinster debut in Round 10 of the 2020–21 Pro14 against .

National team
Smith played for the Ireland under-20 national rugby union team in 2020. 

He has played for the Ireland national rugby sevens team as a forward since 2021. He competed for Ireland at the 2022 Rugby World Cup Sevens in Cape Town.

References

External links
itsrugby.co.uk Profile

2000 births
Living people
Irish rugby union players
Leinster Rugby players
Rugby union wings
Rugby union players from Dublin (city)